Daniel "Danny the Lion" Leo (born January 16, 1928 in East Harlem, New York City) is the former acting boss of the Genovese crime family, the biggest of New York's Five Mafia families.

Early life and career
Leo was once a member of the notorious East Harlem Purple Gang in the 1970s. He is also known as "Daniel Leonetti" and "Daniel Leonardo" (the Federal Bureau of Prisons has his name as "Danny Leo").

Rise in the Genovese family
Leo resides in a luxurious manor in Rockleigh, New Jersey and was a suspected drug trafficker during his earlier years as a soldier in the Genovese crime family.

On June 13, 1980, Leo was indicted for refusing to answer grand jury questions in regards to the murder of 18-year-old Maurice Anzisi.  Anzisi and his girlfriend were murdered in 1978 in the Bronx.

Leo was once the President of a construction company named Elite Ready Mix. Allegedly promoted to captain under the regime of Vincent "Chin" Gigante in the late 1980s or early 1990s after living a low-profile life as a faction-leader in New Jersey, he held a high position in the family with Gigante's top associates Dominick "Quiet Dom" Cirillo, James "Little Jimmy" Ida and Louis "Bobby" Manna. In 2005, Leo became the acting boss of the Genovese family.

Indictment and prison
In May 2007, Leo was one of many Genovese crime family members indicted on federal loansharking and extortion charges. In early 2008, Leo pleaded guilty to racketeering and loansharking. He was sentenced to five years in prison. His projected release date was October 7, 2011, but on January 10, 2010, he pleaded guilty to racketeering charges and faced up to 40 years in prison. In March 2010, he was sentenced to an additional 18 months in prison and fined $1.3 million. Leo began serving his time at the low security facility at Federal Correctional Complex, Coleman in Florida, but was subsequently released into community corrections in Miami. He was released from federal custody on January 25, 2013.

References

1941 births
American gangsters of Italian descent
Genovese crime family
Acting bosses of the Five Families
People convicted of racketeering
Living people
American prisoners and detainees
Prisoners and detainees of the United States federal government
People from Rockleigh, New Jersey
People from East Harlem